Luteimonas composti is a moderately thermophilic, yellow-pigmented bacterium. It is Gram-negative  and rod-shaped, with type strain CC-YY255(T) (=CCUG 53595(T) =CIP 109311(T) =BCRC 17598(T)).

References

Further reading
Whitman, William B., et al., eds. Bergey’s Manual® of Systematic Bacteriology. Vol. 2. Springer, 2012.

External links

LPSN
Type strain of Luteimonas composti at BacDive -  the Bacterial Diversity Metadatabase

Xanthomonadales
Gram-negative bacteria
Bacteria described in 2007